Toussaint Service (born 1 November 1969) is a Congolese footballer. He played in ten matches for the Congo national football team from 1997 to 2000. He was also named in Congo's squad for the 2000 African Cup of Nations tournament.

References

1969 births
Living people
Republic of the Congo footballers
Republic of the Congo international footballers
2000 African Cup of Nations players
Place of birth missing (living people)
Association football defenders
Étoile du Congo players